Victoria Nika Zdrok (born 3 March 1973) is a Ukrainian-American pornographic actress, author, and model. She is Playboy's Playmate for October 1994. In June 2002 she became Penthouse magazine's Pet of the Month, later being chosen as their 2004 Penthouse Pet of the Year. Zdrok is also a non-practicing attorney, a clinical psychologist and sex therapist.

Early life
Zdrok was born on March 3, 1973, in Kyiv, Ukrainian SSR. Zdrok did her undergraduate studies at West Chester University, obtained her J.D. from Villanova University School of Law, and her Ph.D. in psychology from Drexel University.

Career
Zdrok was crowned Philadelphia's "Best Beauty" in August 1994. In October of the same year, she became a Playboy centerfold.

Zdrok appeared in Penthouse as their June 2002 Pet of the Month. In 2004, at the age of 30, she was named Penthouse Pet of the Year. She is the second centerfold, after Linn Thomas, to be both a Playboy Playmate and a Penthouse Pet.

Zdrok has performed in adult films such as Lesbians in Lust, Assturbators 2, and The Best of Victoria Zdrok.

Filmography 

 2009 — Guide to Great Sex
 2007 — Best of Facesitting POV 3
 2006 — Asses of Face Destruction
 2006 — Soloerotica 9
 2005 — For Your Ass Only
 2005 — Assturbators 2
 2005 — Three's Cumpany
 2004 — Lesbians in Lust
 2004 — Dark Side
 2003 — Temptation
 2003 — Soloerotica 4
 2002 — Bare-Skinned Captives
 2000 — Centerfold Coeds: Girlfriends — Вера
 1998 — Satin Smoke
 1998 — Star of Jaipur

Other work
Zdrok has written several books on sex, including The Anatomy of Pleasure and Dr. Z on Scoring: How to Pick Up, Seduce and Hook Up With Hot Women.

See also
List of Penthouse Pets

References

External links

 
 
 

1973 births
21st-century American women writers
Drexel University alumni
Soviet emigrants to the United States
1990s Playboy Playmates
American pornographic film actresses
Ukrainian pornographic film actresses
Sex educators
American people of Ukrainian descent
Living people
Penthouse Pets of the Year
West Chester University alumni
Villanova University alumni
Penthouse Pets
Actors from Kyiv
Pensacola State College alumni